Pavel Juráček (2 August 1935 – 20 May 1989) was a Czech screenwriter and film director who studied at FAMU. Juráček started as a screenwriter for many Czech New Wave movies until he became a director. He worked in Prague at the Barrandov film studios; however after his satirical movie Case for a Rookie Hangman (1970) was shelved, he was fired from Barrandov and wasn't allowed to make movies anymore.

Filmography

Director 
 Joseph Kilian (1963) – co-directed with Jan Schmidt; Grand Prize at ISFF Oberhausen, FIPRESCI Prize at IFF Mannheim
 Every Young Man (1965)
 Case for a Rookie Hangman (1970)

Screenwriter only 
 Black and White Sylva (1961) – directed by Jan Schmidt
 Ceiling (1962) – directed by Věra Chytilová
 Keeper of Dynamite (1963) – directed by Zdeněk Sirový
 Voyage to the End of the Universe (1963) – directed by Jindřich Polák
 A Jester's Tale (Bláznova kronika) (1964) – directed by Karel Zeman
 Nobody Will Laugh (1966) – directed by Hynek Bočan
 Daisies (1966) – directed by Věra Chytilová
 Late August at the Hotel Ozone (1967) – directed by Jan Schmidt
 Kinoautomat (1967) – directed by Radúz Činčera

References

External links 
 

Charter 77 signatories
Czech film directors
Czechoslovak film directors
Czech screenwriters
Male screenwriters
1935 births
1989 deaths
Recipients of Medal of Merit (Czech Republic)
20th-century screenwriters